Harmlessness is the second studio album by American indie rock band The World Is a Beautiful Place & I Am No Longer Afraid to Die. It was announced on August 4, 2015, and was released on September 25. The title of the album is a play on the name of the band's first EP, Formlessness.

Reception

Harmlessness charted at number 11 on the Heatseekers Albums chart, and at number 46 on the Independent Albums chart. Upon release, the album received critical acclaim. At Metacritic, which assigns a normalized rating out of 100 to reviews from specialized critics, the album received an average score of 84, based on 6 reviews. Stereogum placed the album at number 13 on their top 50 albums of 2015 list. James of Stereogum wrote: "It's not the kind of music that will change the world, but it might just change your life." Aaron Mook of AbsolutePunk wrote: "Harmlessness is ambitious and intimidating in scope; it is not an easy listen, but with the right amount of time and dedication, it is easily one of the most rewarding listens of 2015." "January 10th, 2014" appeared on a best-of emo songs list by Vulture.

Accolades

Track listing

Personnel
The lineup for this album is:
 David Bello - vocals
 Nicole Shanholtzer - guitar, vocals 
 Josh Cyr - bass guitar, acoustic guitar 
 Katie Dvorak - synthesizer, vocals 
 Steven Buttery - percussion 
 Chris Teti - production, engineering, mixing, guitar, vocals, percussion
 Nick Kwas - violin
 Tyler Bussey - guitar, banjo, vocals 
 Greg Horbal - guitar

References

2015 albums
The World Is a Beautiful Place & I Am No Longer Afraid to Die albums
Epitaph Records albums